Ladha Singhwali is a village in the Punjab province of Pakistan. It is located at 30°47'10N 74°11'35E with an altitude of 178 metres (587 feet).

References

Villages in Punjab, Pakistan